Parliament House in Darwin is Australia's newest Parliament Building. It has been the seat of the Northern Territory Legislative Assembly since 1994. Parliament House is located on State Square in the centre of Darwin, which is also the administrative centre of the Northern Territory law and government. It features Post modern features and was designed by Architect Tim Rogers, of Meldrum Burrows and Partners Pty Ltd. The Northern Territory Library is housed in Parliament House.  Construction of Parliament House began in 1990, and the building was completed in 1994, and officially opened by the Governor-General of Australia, Bill Hayden on 18 August 1994. Before Parliament House the former Northern Territory Legislative Council established in 1948 was housed in various temporary buildings around Darwin. After 1974, the Northern Territory Legislative Assembly continued to operate on the same basis, and settled in buildings on the current location until 1990 when they were demolished to allow commencement of the construction of Parliament House. From 1990 to the end of 1994, the Assembly temporarily met in the Chan Building.

Two workers were killed during the construction of Parliament House when a crane collapsed in March 1991.

References

External links
 
 Parliament House History
 Northern Territory Legislative Assembly website

Legislative buildings in Australia
Buildings and structures in Darwin, Northern Territory
Tourist attractions in Darwin, Northern Territory
Parliament of the Northern Territory
1994 establishments in Australia
Government buildings completed in 1994